St. Hedwig's Roman Catholic Church, (Kościół Świętej Jadwigi in Polish) is a church and former parish of the Roman Catholic located at 1702 N. Humboldt Ave. on Milwaukee, Wisconsin's East Side at the center of the East Brady Street Historic District, in the Roman Catholic Archdiocese of Milwaukee.

Dedication
This church is dedicated to St. Hedwig (Jadwiga of Poland), queen and saint of Poland.

History

Polish immigrants congregated not only on Milwaukee’s south side, but also on its east side. Most of the settlers had come from Prussia and suffered through Otto Von Bismarck’s repressive Kulturkampf. The area was known as the "Kepa", or "camp", because it had once had a military camp. In the beginning Polish residents from Milwaukee’s east side who wished to attend Mass in their native language made a long and arduous journey on foot to St. Stanislaus. Those who were not up to this task attended St. Mary’s on Broadway or St. John Nepomuc, a Bohemian church.

The Poles on Milwaukee's east side were energized by the construction of St. Stanislaus church on the south side, and 40 families met in 1871 to organize their own parish closer to home. A wooden church was erected on the corner of Brady and Humboldt and dedicated to St. Hedwig, who had been a queen of Poland.

In 1885, a major riot broke out in the church over the choice of an organist. Riots ensued and the police were called in to bring order. The priest resigned and the parish was closed by the Archdiocese for three months. A new pastor, Father Clement Rogozinski was appointed and his first Mass was said on December 11, 1885. Father Rogozinski had been born in Poland in 1835 and had been ordained in Łowicz in 1861, just as another national uprising was taking place against the Tsar. The provisional Polish government had chosen Rogozinski to administer the oath of allegiance to the rebels. After the uprising failed, Rogozinski tried to escape to Galicia, but was detained by the Russian police and imprisoned in Olomuniec for 11 months. After his release, he journeyed to America, finally settling in Milwaukee. Father Rogozinski, who was revered by the local Polish community for his patriotic efforts, brought a calming presence to the parish, and the wounds were healed.

As the parish grew, the original church structure proved to be too small, having been originally designed for only 200 parishioners. It was now bursting at the seams with nearly 600 area families wishing to attend Mass. Two lots were purchased from a Mr. Kowalski for $6000, and the parish borrowed an additional $15,000 to begin construction of a new church. In August 1886, excavation for the new church began. The clay around Milwaukee lacked iron, so the church was built in the cream colored brick known as "Cream City brick", which was typical of Milwaukee structures at the time.

Following World War II, the ethnic mix of the neighborhood began to change. Poles left the area to be replaced by Irish, Italians, and Hispanics. In the 1960s the Brady Street area became the hub of Milwaukee's counterculture movement as the neighborhood continued to change.

On July 1, 2000, St. Hedwig’s was consolidated with Holy Rosary Church, formerly an Irish church, and St. Rita’s, founded by Italians, to form The Three Holy Women parish. It serves an ethnically and culturally diverse neighborhood.

Architecture
St Hedwig's was designed by local architect Henry Messmer. A Romanesque-influenced building, its decorative elements are drawn from Gothic, 18th-century and Eastern European motifs. The copper-clad spire of the central tower recalls the 18th and 19th century churches of Eastern Europe. St. Hedwig's, like other Polish churches in Milwaukee, is characterized by arched windows and domical towers and spires.

See also
Hyacinth (Jacek) Gulski

References

Bibliography
 Borun, Thaddeus. We, the Milwaukee Poles. Milwaukee: Nowiny Publishing, 1946.
 Kruszka, Wacław. A History of Poles In America to 1908. Washington DC, 2001.
 Smallshaw, John M. Faith Cast in Stone: The Polish Churches of Milwaukee, 1866-2000. 2009.
 St. Hedwig's Centennial Book 1971

External links
 The Polish Churches of Milwaukee
Guide to Milwaukee 's Historic Buildings in Cream City Brick
The Ethno-Religious Landscape of Milwaukee's East Village

Roman Catholic churches in Milwaukee
Polish-American culture in Milwaukee
Religious organizations established in 1871
1871 establishments in Wisconsin
East Side, Milwaukee